Hưng Thịnh is a commune in Trấn Yên District, Yên Bái Province, Vietnam.

In 2019, the estimated population was 4,318, and the population density was 193 people/km².

References

Districts of Yên Bái province